The 1957–58 Landsdelsserien was a Norwegian second-tier football league season.

The league was contested by 54 teams, divided into a total of seven groups from four districts; Østland/Søndre, Østland/Nordre, Sørland/Vestre and Møre/Trøndelag. The two group winners in the Østland districts, Greåker and Kapp promoted directly to the 1958–59 Hovedserien. The other five group winners qualified for promotion play-offs to compete for two spots in the following season's top flight. Årstad and Freidig won the play-offs and were promoted.

Tables

District Østland/Søndre

District Østland/Nordre

District Sørland/Vestland

Group A1

Group A2

Group B

District Møre/Trøndelag

Møre

Trøndelag

Promotion play-offs
Sørland/Vestland 
Results A1–A2
Jerv 3–2 Stavanger
Results A–B
Jerv 0–2 Årstad

Årstad won 2–0 over Jerv and were promoted to Hovedserien.

Møre/Trøndelag
Freidig 3–1 Kristiansund
Kristiansund 2–3 Freidig

Freidig won 6–3 on aggregate and were promoted to Hovedserien.

References

Norwegian First Division seasons
1957 in Norwegian football
1958 in Norwegian football
Norway